Dorothy Black (18 September 1899 – 19 February 1985) was a South African-British actress.

Biography
Black was born and raised in Johannesburg and attended St. Andrew's School for Girls. She went on to train at the Royal Central School of Speech and Drama in London.

She started her career appearing in Outward Bound, The Farmer's Wife, The Trojan Women and The Constant Nymph. Her first performance in London was in the play Blue Comet at the Royal Court Theatre. Other West End plays included Dear Brutus, Poison Pen, Six Characters in Search of an Author and The Brontes.
   
Black appeared in many TV appearances since the early BBC broadcasts at Alexandra Palace.

Selected filmography
 The Farmer's Wife (1928)
 Young Woodley (1928)
 Her Reputation (1931)
 Captivation (1931)
 The Admiral's Secret (1933)
 Imitation of Life (1934 film) (1934, uncredited) 
 The Night Has Eyes (1942)
 Jane Eyre (1956)
 David Copperfield (1956)

References

External links 
 
 Profile of Dorothy Black

1899 births
1985 deaths
20th-century British actresses
20th-century South African actresses
Actresses from Johannesburg
Alumni of the Royal Central School of Speech and Drama
South African emigrants to the United Kingdom
South African people of British descent
White South African people